Earthlight is the diffuse reflection of sunlight reflected from Earth's surface and clouds. Earthshine (an example of planetshine), also known as the Moon's ashen glow, is the dim illumination of the otherwise unilluminated portion of the Moon by this indirect sunlight. Earthlight on the Moon during the waxing crescent is called "the old Moon in the new Moon's arms", while that during the waning crescent is called "the new Moon in the old Moon's arms".

Earthlight has a calculated maximum apparent magnitude of −17.7 as viewed from the Moon. This is only 0.01% of the radiance from direct Sunlight. Earthshine has a calculated maximum apparent magnitude of −3.69 as viewed from Earth.

This phenomenon is most visible from Earth at night (or astronomical twilight) a few days before or after the day of new moon, when the lunar phase is a thin crescent. On these nights, the entire lunar disk is both directly and indirectly sunlit, and is thus unevenly bright enough to see. Earthshine is most clearly seen after dusk during the waxing crescent (in the western sky) and before dawn during the waning crescent (in the eastern sky).

The term earthlight would also be suitable for an observer on the Moon seeing Earth during the lunar night, or for an astronaut inside a spacecraft looking out the window. Arthur C. Clarke uses it in this sense in his 1955 novel Earthlight.

Radio frequency transmissions are also reflected by the moon; for example, see Earth–Moon–Earth communication.

See also
List of light sources
Starlight
Moonlight
Sunlight
Ashen Light

References

External links
 

Lunar observation
Earth phenomena
Light sources